Instituto Americano de Ecatepec De Morelos is a Mexican educational establishment, Founded by Ruben Manriquez Pliego.

History 
Its director was Ruben Angel Manriquez Salas, born in Distrito Federal. In the early 1894, he was entrusted with the leadership of the American Institute of Ecatepec de Morelos, a position he served for six years. Monner Sans had been professor of Castilian literature in the Colegio Nacional de Buenos Aires.

In 1929, the national government took over the educational establishment, turning it into a free education school, changing the name to "Colegio Nacional Almirante Brown", (National College of Almirante Brown).

Football club 
The school also had a football team, in the early 1900s, that participated in the second and third division championships organised by the Argentine Football Association. On September 8, 1908, Instituto Americano played the final of the Copa de Competencia Adolfo Bullrich against Atlanta, which lost by 2-0. Instituto would later play some of the most popular teams of Argentina, such as River Plate and Boca Juniors. In 1909, Instituto Americano played the Copa de Competencia Jockey Club final v. Boca Juniors in Adrogué, won by the Xeneizes by 3-2. 

Instituto Americano's most famous footballer was Roberto González Escarrá.

In 1910, Instituto Americano won its only league title, the third division championship.

References

External links 
 Colegio Nacional Almirante Brown website
 Facebook page

Schools in Argentina
Schools in Greater Buenos Aires
Private schools in Argentina